The 2020–21 Club Atlético Boca Juniors season is the 92st consecutive Primera División season for the senior squad. It is an unusual season, due to the suspension of all competitions in March 2020. The season won't have Primera Division tournament, instead, it will be played the 2020 Copa de la Liga Profesional from October 2020 to January 2021, a cup that was conceived as a contingency competition after the schedule for a regular league season had been repeatedly delayed because of the COVID-19 pandemic. The second competition will be another national cup, the 2021 Copa de la Liga Profesional, from February to May 2021. Boca Juniors also took part in the Copa Argentina where they also won the competition, as well as competing in the Group stage and Final stages of the 2020 Copa Libertadores and in the Group stage of the 2021 Copa Libertadores.

Season overview

July
Agustín Rossi, Nahuel Molina, Julián Chicco, Franco Cristaldo, Sebastián Pérez, Gonzalo Maroni, Walter Bou, Mateo Retegui and Nazareno Solís returned from their respective loans. Boca and Marcos Díaz agreed to mutually terminate the goalkeeper's contract, Díaz subsequently joined Talleres (C). Boca and Nahuel Molina agreed to mutually terminate the defender's contract, Molina subsequently joined Udinese. Junior Alonso ended his loan with Boca and returned to his club.

August
Jan Hurtado is loaned to Brazilian Red Bull Bragantino. Goalkeeper Javier García arrives as a free agent. Boca extended one year the loan of Franco Soldano, loaned from Olympiakos. On August 21, Boca confirms that Edwin Cardona is loaned from Tijuana; also, the club announces that has reached an agreement for the transfer of Emanuel Reynoso to Minnesota United FC.

September 
Franco Cristaldo is loaned to Huracán until December 2021. Nazareno Solís is loaned to OFI Crete until December 2021. Marcelo Weigandt is loaned to Gimnasia y Esgrima (LP) until December 2021. On September 17 Boca won 2-0 Libertad, in the return of Copa Libertadores. Sebastián Pérez is loaned to Boavista until December 2021. On September 24 Boca defeated Independiente Medellín 1–0 in Copa Libertadores. On September 29 Boca drew 0–0 against Libertad in Copa Libertadores.

October 
Iván Marcone is loaned to Elche until December 2021. On October 21 midfielder Diego González arrives to Boca as a free agent. The last team of González was Racing Club. On October 22 Boca beat Caracas 3-0 and ended the group stage of Copa Libertadores in first place. Mateo Retegui is loaned to Talleres (C) until December 2021. On October 31 Boca defeated Lanús 2–1 in the first match of 2020 Copa de la Liga Profesional.

November 
On November 8 Boca defeated Newell's 2–0. Guillermo Fernández was on loan from Cruz Azul, although the club had agreed with the Mexican team a purchase option that expires on December 31, the player communicated that he did not want to continue in Boca. On November 15 Boca lost 1–0 against Talleres (C). On November 20, Boca suffered another defeat, 2–1 against Lanús. On November 29 Boca defeated Newell's 2–0.

December 
In the first leg of Round of 16 of Copa Libertadores Boca defeated Internacional 1–0. Walter Bou is loaned to Defensa y Justicia until December 2021. On December 6, Boca drew 0–0 against Talleres (C) and qualified to Fase Campeón. On December 9, Boca lost 1–0 against Internacional but won 5–4 on penalties, in the quarterfinals the club will play against Racing. On December 12 Boca drew against Arsenal 1-1. On December 16, Boca lost to Racing 1–0 in Copa Libertadores. On December 19, Boca defeated Independiente 2–1. On December 23, Boca defeated Racing 2-0 and advanced to the semifinals of Copa Libertadores, facing Santos of Brazil. On December 27, Boca defeated Huracán 3–0. The first Superclásico of the year against River ended in a 2–2 draw.

January 
Cristian Pavón returned from his loan on LA Galaxy. On January 6, Boca drew 0–0 against Santos in Copa Libertadores semifinals. On January 9, Boca drew 2–2 against Argentinos Juniors and advanced to the final of 2020 Copa de la Liga Profesional. On January 13, Boca lost 3–0 against Santos and was eliminated in the semifinals of 2020 Copa Libertadores. On January 17, Boca won the 2020 Copa de la Liga Profesional after beating Banfield on penalties.

February 
After being loaned on Celta de Vigo, Lucas Olaza is again loaned, until the end of the season, to Real Valladolid.
 Marcos Rojo arrives from Manchester United as a free player. Gastón Ávila is loaned to Rosario Central. On February 14 Boca drew 2–2 against Gimnasia y Esgrima (LP) in the first match of 2021 Copa de la Liga Profesional. On February 21 Boca defeated Newell's 1–0. On February 28 Boca drew 1–1 against Sarmiento (J).

March 
On March 3 Boca defeated Claypole 2-1 and advanced to the Round of 32 of Copa Argentina. On March 7 Boca defeated Vélez Sarsfield 7–1. On March 14 in the Superclásico against River, Boca drew 1-1. On March 21 Boca lost 2–1 against Talleres (C). On March 24 Boca defeated Defensores de Belgrano 3-0 and advanced to the Round of 16 of Copa Argentina. On March 20 Boca drew 1–1 against Independiente.

April 
On April 3 Boca defeated Defensa y Justicia 2–1. Ramón Ábila is loaned to Minnesota United FC. On April 11 Boca lost 1–0 against Unión. On April 17 Boca defeated Atlético Tucumán 3–1. In the beginning of 2021 Copa Libertadores, Boca defeated The Strongest 1–0. On April 24 defeated Atlético Tucumán 1–0. On April 27 Boca defeated Brazilian Santos 2–0.

May 
On May 2 Boca defeated Lanús 1-0 and qualified to the final stages of 2021 Copa de la Liga Profesional. On May 4 Boca lost 1–0 against Ecuadorian Barcelona in Copa Libertadores. On May 8 an alternative Boca lost 1–0 against Patronato. On May 11 Boca lost 1–0 against Brazilian Santos in Copa Libertadores. The Superclásico against River on may 16 ended 1-1 and Boca won 4–2 on penalties. On May 20 Boca drew 0–0 against Ecuadorian Barcelona in Copa Libertadores. The semifinals of Copa de la Liga Profesional 2021 are momentarily suspended because of COVID-19. On May 26 Boca defeated 3–0 against Bolivian The Strongest and qualified to the final stages of 2021 Copa Libertadores. On May 31 Boca was defeated 4–2 on penalties after a 1–1 draw against Racing, ending the participation in 2021 Copa de la Liga Profesional.

Current squad

Last updated on May 31, 2021.

Transfers

Winter

In

Out

Summer

In

Out

Competitions

Overall

1: The Round of 16 will be played in the next season.
2: Two games of the group stage were played in the previous season, that was suspended due to the COVID-19 pandemic, and resumed on 15 September 2020, with the final rescheduled to be played in late January 2021.
3: The final stages will be played in the next season.

Copa de la Liga Profesional 2020

Group stage

Zone 4

Matches

Fase Campeon

Zone A

Matches

Final

Copa de la Liga Profesional 2021

Group stage

Zone 2

Matches

Quarterfinals

Semifinals

Copa Argentina

Round of 64

Round of 32

Round of 16

Quarterfinals

Semifinals

Final

2020 Copa Libertadores

Group stage

Final Stages

Round of 16

Quarterfinals

Semifinals

2021 Copa Libertadores

Group stage

Team statistics

Season Appearances and goals

|-
! colspan="14" style="background:#00009B; color:gold; text-align:center"| Goalkeepers

|-
! colspan="14" style="background:#00009B; color:gold; text-align:center"| Defenders

|-
! colspan="16" style="background:#00009B; color:gold; text-align:center"| Midfielder

|-
! colspan="16" style="background:#00009B; color:gold; text-align:center"| Forwards

|-
! colspan="14" style="background:#00009B; color:gold; text-align:center"| Players who have made an appearance or had a squad number this season, but have left the club

|}

Top scorers

Top assists

Penalties

Clean sheets

Disciplinary record

Notes

References

External links
 Club Atlético Boca Juniors official web site 

Club Atlético Boca Juniors seasons